List of administrative division codes of the PRC in Division 5 or Southwest China .

Chongqing (50)

Sichuan (51)

Guizhou (52)

Yunnan (53)

Tibet (54)

China geography-related lists